Lithuanian may refer to:
 Lithuanians
 Lithuanian language
 The country of Lithuania
 Grand Duchy of Lithuania
 Culture of Lithuania
 Lithuanian cuisine
 Lithuanian Jews as often called "Lithuanians" (Lita'im or Litvaks) by other Jews, sometimes used to mean Mitnagdim

See also
 List of Lithuanians

Language and nationality disambiguation pages